Lorraine Kenton (born 31 May 1983) is a Jamaican born Canadian woman cricketer. She was part of the Canadian women's cricket team at the 2013 ICC Women's World Twenty20 Qualifier.

References

External links 
 
 Profile at CricHQ

1983 births
Living people
Canadian women cricketers
Canadian people of Jamaican descent
Jamaican expatriates in Canada